Games at High Speeds is the first full-length album by Pilot to Gunner, released in 2001. It was re-released in 2003.

Critical reception
Uncut wrote that "for all their complexities, Pilot To Gunner repeat their explosive shifts too often." AllMusic wrote that the album "ultimately isn't a surprising reinvention of the wheel and gets a touch samey towards the end, but it still makes a fine first album from a band that shows some distinct promise." CMJ New Music Monthly called it "a riveting and raucous jaunt that begs repeatedly listening."

Track listing
 Every Minute Is a Movie  (3:34) 
 We Got Games at High Speeds  (2:44) 
 Action Items  (2:43)  
 Zero Return   (3:12)  
 Put It in the Post   (2:37)  
 It's So Good to Be Here in Paris  (4:09)  
 Bring It Live   (2:54)  
 Believer Receiver   (2:52)  
 Band Finale   (3:13)  
 The Lurid Loop's Dead   (3:59)  
 Run Interference   (3:54)

LP version
Pilot to Gunner released the album on vinyl in 2006. The only difference is the removal of the song "Action Items."

References

2003 albums
Pilot To Gunner albums
Arena Rock Recording Company albums